Francisco Miranda da Costa Lobo (1864–1945) was a Portuguese astronomer, known as a pioneer of spectrography and of cinematographical observations in solar astronomy.

Da Costa Lobo spent his career as a professor at the University of Coimbra and the director of the University's astronomical observatory.

Da Costa Lobo developed his own "radiant" theory based on Le Sage's theory of gravitation and was a "radical critic of relativity and quantum theories".

He was three times an invited speaker at the International Congress of Mathematicians — in Strasbourg in 1920, in Toronto in 1924), and in Zurich in 1932. His honors include Grand Cross of Alfonso XII, Commander of the Legion d'Honneur, and Foreign Member of the Pontifical Academy of Sciences.

References

1864 births
1945 deaths
Portuguese astronomers
Academic staff of the University of Coimbra